The Sichuan Jinqiang Blue Whales (sometimes spelled Whale) (四川金强蓝鲸), also known as Sichuan Jinqiang or Sichuan Jinrong Industry, are a professional basketball team based in Wenjiang District, Chengdu, Sichuan, China, which plays in the North Division of the Chinese Basketball Association. The Jinqiang Group is the club's corporate sponsor while its mascot is a blue whale.

In 2016, the team won the CBA Finals in their first appearance in the championship series, defeating the Liaoning Flying Leopards 4–1 in the best of seven series. They became the fifth different club to claim the title in the league's 21 seasons of existence, and the fastest expansion squad to ever do so, winning the title in just their third campaign in the CBA.

History
The team spent the first four years of its existence a member of the higher-tier Chinese National Basketball League, until getting "promoted" ahead of the 2013–14 CBA season, after winning the NBL championship in 2013.

Affectionately referred to by many local fans as the Sichuan Army (川军), the club received international media attention during the 2014–15 CBA season, after signing former NBA All-Star Metta World Peace. Embracing his move to China, the man born as Ron Artest soon gave himself a new name, The Panda's Friend.

The team missed the CBA Playoffs for a second straight year, however, finishing 18th of 20 clubs with a record of 8–30, and despite telling reporters he "had indeed found a bit of inner peace in Sichuan", World Peace headed to Italy after the campaign ended. His departure left the Blue Whales to adopt a different offensive approach for the 2015–16 CBA season.

During the ensuing campaign, Sichuan would reach surprising success by finishing in third place in the regular season standings with a record of 30–8, and earning the third seed in the playoffs. The Blue Whales tied the Xinjiang Flying Tigers for the second-best record in the regular season, and matched up with them in the semi-final round of the playoffs. The team advanced to the 2016 CBA Finals against the Liaoning Flying Leopards after sweeping the Guangsha Lions and the Xinjiang Flying Tigers in the first two rounds of the postseason.

During the Finals, the Blue Whales lost their first game against the top-seeded Flying Leopards, before winning four straight contests to claim their first-ever CBA championship. The series was notable for a very controversial situation, however, as a brawl between a group of Sichuan fans and several Liaoning players erupted at a hotel lobby in Chengdu after Game Three. Footage of the incident went viral on numerous Chinese and international websites, and the league received scathing criticism from the country's media. The Blue Whales were fined by the CBA for not providing adequate security, while the Flying Leopards that were involved in the fight were to be disciplined at the start of the following season. Hamed Haddadi would also be the first Asian to not be born in a Chinese providence to be named the CBA Finals MVP in 2016.

Roster

Notable players 

Current Chinese players
  Liu Wei (2016–present)Current International players  Hamed Haddadi (2013–2014, 2015–present)
  Mike Harris (2015–present)Former International players  Alan Ogg (1996–1997 under the Sichuan Pandas name)
  Hassan Whiteside (2013)
  Chang Tsung-hsien (2013–2015)
   Hervé Lamizana (2013)
  Darius Johnson-Odom (2013)
   Michael Efevberha (2013–15)
  D.J. White (2013–2014)
  Daniel Orton (2014–2015)
  Metta World Peace (known in China as The Panda's Friend) (2014–2015)
  Josh Smith (2016–2017)
  Tyler Hansbrough''' (2019–2020)

References

External links 
 Club profile at EuroBasket.com

Chinese Basketball Association teams
Sport in Chengdu
Basketball teams established in 2009
2009 establishments in China